Together Again is the upcoming tenth concert tour by American singer Janet Jackson. The tour in North America, was announced on December 12, 2022, via Janet's social media and is set to begin on April 14, 2023, in Hollywood, Florida and will end in Seattle on June 21, 2023. The tour takes its name from Jackson’s international hit single from The Velvet Rope.

Background
On December 11, 2022, Jackson hinted a surprise on her Instagram for 8:50am, the next morning. That same night, photos leaked of the Milwaukee date of the tour at Henry Maier Festival Park. The following day, she would embark on a tour titled Together Again, which will feature new music. Thirty-three dates in North America were announced, with tickets going on pre-sale the next day; general on-sale tickets went on sale on December 16, 2022. The opening act of the tour will be American rapper Ludacris. Due to high demand new shows were added in Hollywood, Atlanta and New York City as well as a new show in Allentown, Pennsylvania.

Tour dates

References

External links
https://www.janetjackson.com
https://www.livenation.com

2023 concert tours
Janet Jackson concert tours